James Hennessy may refer to:

 James Hennessy (diplomat) (born 1923), British diplomat and civil servant
 James Hennessy (politician) (1867–1945), French politician, naval officer and equestrian
 James Hennessy, 2nd Baron Windlesham (1903–1962), British peer and decorated British Army officer